Pietro Paolo Febei (died 4 August 1649) was a Roman Catholic prelate who served as Bishop of Bagnoregio (1635–1649).

Biography
On 9 July 1635, Pietro Paolo Febei was appointed during the papacy of Pope Urban VIII as Bishop of Bagnoregio. On 15 July 1635, he was consecrated bishop by Giulio Cesare Sacchetti, Bishop of Fano. He served as Bishop of Bagnoregio until his death on 4 August 1649.

References

External links and additional sources
 (for Chronology of Bishops) 
 (for Chronology of Bishops) 

17th-century Italian Roman Catholic bishops
Bishops appointed by Pope Urban VIII
1649 deaths